This article list ranks the tallest buildings in India that stand at least  tall, based on standard height measurement. This means that spires and other architectural details are included in the official height, but not antenna masts, as it is defined by the Council on Tall Buildings and Urban Habitat. Only habitable buildings are ranked, which excludes radio masts and towers, observation towers, temples, chimneys, and other tall architectural structures.

The era of skyscrapers in India began with the completion of the LIC Building in Chennai in 1959. With 12 floors initially, it was the first skyscraper in the country and remained the tallest building in the country until 1961 when it was surpassed by the 25-storied Usha Kiran Building in Mumbai. Many taller buildings appeared in various cities in the country ever since. Palais Royale structurally topped out in 2018 as the tallest building in the country with a height of 320 meters but the building is still under construction.
Several taller buildings are under construction as well as some are on-hold.

Mumbai has the highest number of skyscrapers and high-rise buildings in India, more than 200 skyscrapers and 5,600 high-rise buildings currently exist in the Mumbai Metropolitan Region. Delhi-NCR has also witnessed a massive construction boom in the last 20 years with around 18 skyscrapers and 5,200 high-rise buildings already constructed in the region. Kolkata has 14 existing skyscrapers and around 800 completed high rise buildings. Bangalore, Mangalore, Hyderabad, Chennai, Kochi, Pune, Ahmedabad, and Surat also have numerous high-rise buildings.

Tallest buildings 
This list includes buildings that have been completed or have topped out. Architectural height is used, therefore masts and other elements are discounted in height measurement. This includes spires and architectural details, but does not include antenna masts.

Tallest buildings (under-construction) 
This lists ranks buildings that are under construction in India and are planned to rise at least  or 65 floors tall. Buildings that are only approved, on hold or proposed are not included in this table.

Proposed, approved, or on hold

On hold
This list ranks buildings that were once under construction and are now on hold and are planned to rise at least  or 40 floors tall.

Proposed or approved 
This list ranks buildings that are approved or proposed and are planned to rise at least  or 50 floors tall.

Timeline of tallest buildings of India

See also 

 List of tallest buildings and structures in the Indian subcontinent
 List of tallest buildings in different cities in India
 List of tallest buildings in Asia
 List of tallest structures in India
 List of tallest buildings in the world
 List of tallest structures in the world

Notes

References 

134. Three Sixty West 1 | Buildings. Emporis. Retrieved on 2013-12-06

External links 
 CTBUH India Buildings
 Diagram of India's Skyscrapers – Current, Proposed, and Under Construction

All articles with unsourced statements
 
India
Indian superlatives